Puma pardoides, sometimes called the Eurasian puma or Owen's panther, is an extinct prehistoric cat. It was long regarded as a primitive species of leopard (genus Panthera). Recent work however has shown that Panthera pardoides and Panthera schaubi are actually the same species, and are probably not pantherine at all, but a member of Felinae related to the cougar, making them more properly classified as Puma pardoides.

Classification
Panthera schaubi or Viretailurus schaubi was historically often regarded as a basal member of the genus Panthera.
 However, recent work has shown that Viretailurus should actually be included in the genus Puma as a junior synonym of Puma pardoides. Fossils of this leopard-sized animal are around 2 million years old and were found in France. However, their classification was difficult, due to the similarities between leopards and pumas, until teeth found at the Upper Pliocene Transcaucasian site of Kvabebi were found to be similar to those of pumas.

Taxonomic history
Puma pardoides was originally described in 1846 as Felis pardoides. A complete skull was described in 1954 as Panthera schaubi, but was assigned in 1965 to a new genus as Viretailurus schaubi due to distinct differences from other pantherin cats. In 2001, however, it was pointed out that the various puma-like fossils in Eurasia could all be attributed to a single species, Puma pardoides.

References 

Prehistoric felines
Prehistoric mammals of Europe
pardoides
Mammals described in 1846
Fossil taxa described in 1846